Kot (Pashto-Persian: کوت  Kot) is a district in the northern Nangarhar Province of Afghanistan. From 2015 into the first half of 2016, ISIS's presence in the district mounted to clashes against the Afghan forces. Afghan troops launched an offensive in July 2016 against the group which led to their being pushed out of the district and training camps being destroyed by Afghan forces.

References

Districts of Nangarhar Province